This article uses Logar transcription.

The Soča dialect is a Slovene dialect spoken in upper Soča Valley. It is one of the most archaic Slovene dialects, together with the Natisone Valley, Torre Valley, and Rosen Valley dialects. It borders the Karst dialect to the south, Natisone Valley dialect to the southwest, Torre Valley and Resian dialects to the west, Fiulian and Carinthian Bavarian to the northwest, Gail Valley dialect to the north, Upper Carniolan dialect to the east, and Tolmin dialect to the southeast. The dialect belongs to the Littoral dialect group, and it evolved from Soča–Idrija dialect base.

Geographical extension 
The Soča dialect is the only dialect in the Littoral dialect group that is not spoken in Italy. It spans the area from Volčanski Ruti in the south to Borjana and Žaga in the west, north up to the Vršič Pass, with the northernmost settlements being Strmec na Predelu and Trenta. There is no geographical border on its eastern side, it is spoken west of Tolmin, and it is still spoken in villages such as Tolminske Ravne. It is thus spoken in the entire territory of the Municipality of Bovec, in most of the Municipality of Kobarid (except for the area around Breginj and Livek on the border with Italy, where the Torre Valley and Natisone Valley dialects are spoken), and in several villages in the western and southern parts of the Municipality of Tolmin. Larger settlements include Volče, Volarje, Idrsko, Drežnica, Kobarid, Borjana, Srpenica, Žaga, Bovec, Čezsoča, Soča, and Log pod Mangartom.

Accentual changes 
The Soča dialect has pitch accent on long syllables, which are differentiated from short syllables. The southern microdialects have retained the Alpine Slovene accentuation, whereas the northern microdialects have undergone the  →  and  →  accent shifts under influence from the Gail Valley dialect.

Phonology 
All long and later lengthened e-like vowels turned into , and o-like vowels turned into , except that final  turned into  or into  after . Syllabic  turned into .

Vowel reduction affected all vowels.

Before a front vowel,  turned into  (betacizem), and elsewhere it remained. The consonant  turned into  and into voiced  at the end of a word or partially spirantized into . Final consonants are not always devoiced; only  →  and  → /. The consonant  in the cluster  and at the end of a word also turns into . The consonant  is present in loanwords, and in some dialects  turned into .

Morphology 
The Soča dialect retains neuter gender in all numbers and the dual still exists, but it is used inconsistently. The feminine dual l-participle form merged with the plural. The dialect uses the long infinitive. Verbs in -i- always have the accent on the root ( vs. standard Slovene  'to burn'), and with some reflexive verbs the accent in the imperative shifted to the end ( vs. standard Slovene  'get dressed').

Vocabulary 
A dictionary of words used in the northern microdialects, particularly in Bovec, was written by Barbara Ivančič Kutin in 2007.

References

Bibliography 

 
 

Slovene dialects